Pericle is a masculine given name of Romanic origin. Notable people with the name include:

 Pericle Fazzini (1913–1987), Italian painter and sculptor
 Pericle Felici (1911–1982), Italian prelate of the Catholic Church
 Pericle Martinescu (1911–2005), Romanian writer and journalist
 Pericle Pagliani (1883–1932), Italian long-distance runner
 Pericle Papahagi (1872–1943) Ottoman-born Romanian literary historian and folklorist

See also
 Pericles (disambiguation)